The Albania men's national under-20 basketball team is a national basketball team of Albania, administered by the Albanian Basketball Federation. It represents the country in international men's under-20 basketball competitions.

FIBA U20 European Championship participations

See also
Albania men's national basketball team
Albania men's national under-18 basketball team
Albania women's national under-20 basketball team

References

External links
Archived records of Albania team participations

Basketball in Albania
U
Basketball
Men's national under-20 basketball teams